The Virginia Little Eight Conference was an intercollegiate athletic conference that existed from 1949 to 1958. It was previously known as the Virginia Little Six Conference from 1949 to 1953 and the Virginia Little Seven Conference from 1954 to 1955. As the names suggest, the leagues' members were located in the state of Virginia. Most of the teams now play in the Old Dominion Athletic Conference (ODAC).

Football champions

1949 – Emory & Henry
1950 – Emory & Henry
1951 – Emory & Henry
1952 – Hampden–Sydney

1953 – Hampden–Sydney
1954 – Emory & Henry
1955 – Hampden–Sydney

1956 – Emory & Henry
1957 – Hampden–Sydney
1958 – Emory & Henry

See also
List of defunct college football conferences

References

Defunct college sports conferences in the United States
College sports in Virginia
1949 establishments in Virginia
1958 disestablishments in Virginia
Sports leagues established in 1949